Morávka is a municipality and village in Frýdek-Místek District in the Moravian-Silesian Region of the Czech Republic. It has about 1,200 inhabitants.

Geography
Morávka lies in the historical region of Cieszyn Silesia on the border with Slovakia. The municipality is located in the Moravian-Silesian Beskids.

The Morávka River springs here and flows across the entire municipal territory. The Morávka Dam was built on the river in the municipality in 1960–1966.

History
Morávka was established in 1615. It was then a part of the Friedek state country that was split from the Duchy of Teschen in 1573, which was a part of the Kingdom of Bohemia. After World War I and fall of Austria-Hungary it became a part of Czechoslovakia. In March 1939 it became a part of Protectorate of Bohemia and Moravia.

During World War II, the inhabitants of the municipality took part in the anti-Nazi resistance. In December 1944 the Nazis captured the guerrilla group and after interrogation and torture they obtained information about their supporters: 14 people of the village were executed, 10 were deported into a concentration camp. In 1978, a memorial of the guerrilla movement was declared a national cultural monument.

References

External links

 

Villages in Frýdek-Místek District
Cieszyn Silesia